Pineville is an unincorporated community in Berkeley County, South Carolina, United States. Pineville has a post office with ZIP code 29468, which opened on March 19, 1880.

The Pineville Historic District, which is listed on the National Register of Historic Places, is located in Pineville.

Cross Generating Station is a large coal-fired power station located in Pineville.

References

Unincorporated communities in Berkeley County, South Carolina
Unincorporated communities in South Carolina